JCSD may refer to:
 Jackson County School District (disambiguation)
 Janesville Consolidated School District
 Johnston Community School District